A list of notable flat horse races which take place annually in Ireland, under the authority of Horse Racing Ireland, including all conditions races which currently hold Group 1, 2 or 3 status in the European Pattern.

The distances of the races are expressed in miles, furlongs and yards.

Group 1

Group 2

Group 3

Other races

Discontinued

References
 Revised Group Race Programme in Ireland for 2020 Announced - Revised Irish Pattern 2020.
 2020 Flat Pattern Book - Irish Pattern Races, Listed Races and Premier Handicaps 2020.
 Down Royal - Her Majesty's Plate upgraded to a Listed Race.
 European Pattern Committee 2016 - Curragh races upgraded by European Pattern Committee.

 Flat
Flat races
Horse races, flat
Horse racing-related lists